Mosé Arosio (born 20 October 1892, date of death unknown) was an Italian racing cyclist. He rode in the 1924 Tour de France.

References

1892 births
Year of death missing
Italian male cyclists